Mongu District is a district of Zambia with headquarters at Mongu. As of the 2000 Zambian Census, the district had a population of 162,002 people. More than a quarter of whom live in Mongu town; the remainder live on the floodplain or its edge. East of the Lui River, the population is very low due to the absence of surface water in the dry season.

References

Districts of Western Province, Zambia